The 4th Fast Attack Flotilla (aka Dvora Squadron) is a force element flotilla of the Sri Lanka Navy. The flotilla's mission is to provide heavily armed and fast patrol boat (called fast attack craft or FACs) capability to counter sea tiger movements along the coast and to protect naval and civilian shipping from sea tiger suicide crafts.

History

The flotilla was formed in the early 1980s with the Dvora class fast patrol boats to counter LTTE gun running in the Palk Strait from India. With escalation of the Sri Lankan Civil War the Sea Tigers began to poss a threat to the patrol boats of the Navy, with use of small fibreglass boats armed with machine guns. The flotilla was used as the primary offensive unit to counter these boats. When the Sea Tigers started to use boats for suicide bomber attacks on ships the unit was used for defensive operations too, such as escorting larger naval ships and civilian ships in coastal waters off the norther and eastern provinces of the country. Able to reach speeds of 45konts these FACs operate in pairs to counter sea tiger wolf pack tactics and also to defend each other against small suicide crafts that try ram them.

Armament
Early Dvoras were armed with 2-3 machine guns as most patrol boats in other navies do. However, during the progress of the war the armament on board FACs were increased considerably due to the increase of arms carried on sea tiger boats that ranges from heavy anti aircraft machine guns to rocket launchers. Currently all FACs have Typhoon 25-30mm stabilized cannon are installed as their primary armament, which can be slaved to state-of the art mast-mounted, day and night all weather long range electro-optic systems. This enables FACs to locate and target sea tiger boats at a greater distance, in all weather at high speeds. Newer FACs, specially Colombo class series III FACs are equipped with Elop MSIS optronic director and Typhoon GFCS as its own weapons control system. Also these crafts use surface search: Furuno FR 8250 or Corden Mk 2; I-band as its radar. In addition to its main armament they carry additional weapon systems such as DS30 30mm twin gun, Oerlikon 30 mm twin cannon, Oerlikon 20 mm cannons, automatic grenade launchers, Type 80 machine guns, W85 heavy machine gun &  Type 63  MRLS, including 12.7 mm and 7.62 mm machine guns. These act as both offensive and point defense weapons to protect the FAC from suicide crafts, by destroying them before they could ram or explode close to the FAC. Therefore, compared with similar patrol boats of other navies, Sri Lanka Navy FACs are more heavily armed and faster.

Organization
The flotilla is based at SLN Dockyard, Trincomalee, however boats operate out of all major harbors. Individual units come under the direct command of the Flag officer commanding that particular naval area it is assigned to.

Boat classes

Super Dvora Mk III
Super Dvora - Mk II
Shaldag class
Colombo class (Locally built)
Dvora - Mk I
Simonneau class
Chevron class
Trinity Marine class 
Killer class

Recipient of the Parama Weera Vibhushanaya
 Lieutenant-Commander Jude Wijethunge

Notable members
Admiral Thisara Samarasinghe, RSP, VSV, USP, ndc, psc, DISS, MNI, SLN - former Commander of the Sri Lankan Navy
Vice Admiral  Piyal De Silva - Commander of the Sri Lankan Navy
Rear Admiral Y. N. Jayarathna - Commandant of the Naval and Maritime Academy

References

External links
Home Sri Lanka Navy takes part in the 60th Independence Day Celebrations and accords the Nation a 25 Gun Salute as a Tribute
www.naval-technology.com 
Video documentary by Al Jazeera 
Colombo Class (Fast Attack Craft-Gun)(PFC)
11 LTTE boats destroyed and 70 killed - Pulmodai
 The Wave of Bravery and Courage...
Fluctuating fortunes in a race against time 
Jetliner - Swiftest link between North and South Mega troop carrier hallmark of efficiency: From Ranil Wijeyapala on board the Jetliner

Sri Lanka Navy squadrons
Fast attack craft